Torri del Benaco is a comune (municipality) in the Province of Verona in the Italian region Veneto, located about  west of Venice and about  northwest of Verona, on the eastern coast of the Lake Garda.

Torri del Benaco borders the following municipalities: Brenzone, Costermano, Garda, Gardone Riviera, Gargnano, Salò, San Felice del Benaco, San Zeno di Montagna, and Toscolano-Maderno. It is home to a 14th-century castle which belonged to the Scaliger family, and which perhaps occupies the site of an ancient Roman castrum. It now houses an Ethnographic Museum.

Gallery

Twin towns
Torri del Benaco is twinned with:

  Cadaqués, Spain, since 2006

References

External links
 Official website

Cities and towns in Veneto
Populated places on Lake Garda